The men's 1500 metres event at the 1994 World Junior Championships in Athletics was held in Lisbon, Portugal, at Estádio Universitário de Lisboa on 23 and 24 July.

Medalists

Results

Final
24 July

Heats
23 July

Heat 1

Heat 2

Participation
According to an unofficial count, 26 athletes from 19 countries participated in the event.

References

1500 metres
1500 metres at the World Athletics U20 Championships